Rolando Octavus Joven Tria Tirona, O.C.D. (born July 22, 1946), is a prelate of the Roman Catholic Church in the Philippines. He is the Archbishop of Caceres in Naga, Philippines. He was appointed to succeed the retiring Archbishop Leonardo Legaspi of Caceres.

Biography
Rolando Tirona was born on July 22, 1946, in Kawit, he finished his elementary and secondary education at Centro Escolar University in 1952 and 1958. He completed a degree in political science at San Beda College before he entered San Carlos Seminary in Makati to finish philosophy in 1968. He entered Carmel on August 15, 1964, and solemnly professed vows on February 10, 1968. He was ordained priest on April 21, 1974, in Rome. He was ordained as bishop on December 29, 1994, at the Manila Cathedral.

He served as Auxiliary Bishop of Manila from 1994 to 1996.  He was appointed apostolic administrator of Malolos in January 1996 and served as Bishop the Diocese of Malolos from 1996 to 2003.  He became the Bishop of Infanta in Quezon province for nine years (2003 – 2012).

Archbishop of Caceres
On September 8, 2012, Pope Benedict XVI elevated Tirona to Archbishop of Caceres, replacing the retiring Leonardo Legaspi.

The Archdiocese of Cáceres is a Metropolitan See that comprises the Bicol region, while directly overseeing the third, fourth and fifth congressional districts of Camarines Sur and is centered in Naga. The Archdiocese, having been founded in 1595 in the Royal City of Nueva Caceres (modern-day Naga), is considered one of the oldest in the Philippines with Cebu, Segovia and Manila, and once had jurisdiction that stretched from Samar in the south to Isabela Province in the north. The seat of the Archdiocese is in Pilgrim City of Naga.

References

External links
Archbishop Rolando Joven Tria Tirona, O.C.D. 

1946 births
Living people
People from Kawit, Cavite
21st-century Roman Catholic archbishops in the Philippines
San Beda University alumni
People from Sampaloc, Manila
Discalced Carmelite bishops
Roman Catholic archbishops of Cáceres
Filipino archbishops